Šušanj is a small town in the municipality of Bar, Montenegro.

Overview
The town is located on the coast of the Adriatic Sea between Sutomore and Bar. Its beaches are quite popular because of the nice shade and air quality provided by the pine trees. In summer the town has many tourists staying in local accommodation; bars, restaurants and shops are open throughout the warmer months. The Belgrade–Bar railway passes through the town on its approach to Bar. The town is 500 meters from the Bar and it's connected with a nice promenade.

Demographics
According to the 2011 census, the town has a population of 2,630 people.

References

Populated places in Bar Municipality